For an integer , the minimal polynomial  of  is the non-zero monic polynomial of degree  for  and degree  for  with integer coefficients, such that . Here  denotes the Euler's totient function. In particular, for   one has  and 

For every , the polynomial  is monic, has integer coefficients, and is irreducible over the integers and the rational numbers. These roots are twice the real parts of the primitive th roots of unity.

The polynomials  are typical examples of irreducible polynomials whose roots are all real and which have a cyclic Galois group.

Examples 

The first few polynomials  are

Explicit form if n is odd 
If  is an odd prime, the polynomial  can be written in terms of binomial coefficients following a "zigzag path" through Pascal's triangle:  

Putting  and

then we have  for primes .  

For example,

Explicit form if n is even 

Independently of this, if  is an even prime power, we have for  the recursion (see )
,

Roots 
Since  is monic, we have

 

Combining this result with the fact that the function  is even, we find that  is an algebraic integer for any positive integer  and any integer .

Relation to the cyclotomic polynomials 
For a positive integer , let , a primitive -th root of unity. This relation can be exhibited in the following identity proved by Lehmer, which holds for any non-zero complex number :

Relation to Chebyshev polynomials 

If  is odd, then

 

and if  is even, then

 

Absolute value of the constant coefficient 
The absolute value of the constant coefficient of  can be determined as follows:

Generated algebraic number field 
The algebraic number field  is  the maximal real subfield of a cyclotomic field . In view of this, the discriminant of the algebraic number field  is equal to the discriminant of the polynomial , that is

References 

Number theory
Polynomials
Trigonometry